Sarah Curran (1782 – 5 May 1808) was the youngest daughter of John Philpot Curran, an Irish barrister celebrated for his defence of United Irishmen, and his wife Sarah Curran (née Creagh). She was the great love of the Irish patriot Robert Emmet, executed for treason in 1803.

Life
Sarah Curran was born in Newmarket, County Cork, and brought up at the Priory, Rathfarnham. She met Robert Emmet through her brother Richard, a fellow student at Trinity College, Dublin. However, her father considered Emmet unsuitable as a husband, and their courtship was conducted through letters and clandestine meetings. Notable is a letter from Robert to Sarah. Robert and Sarah were secretly engaged in 1803.
When her father discovered that they were engaged, he disowned Curran and then treated her so harshly that she had to take refuge with friends in Cork. However, this latter statement is contradicted by local historians in Sarah Curran's birth town where it is said that her father did not cast her adrift and that, instead, he sent her to friends in Cork to ensure she was well looked after at this difficult time. After leading an abortive rebellion against British rule in 1803, Emmet was tried and executed for high treason. In Cork, after Emmet's death, Curran met Captain Henry Sturgeon, a nephew of the Marquis of Rockingham, and married him in November 1805. The two lived in Sicily, where Sturgeon was posted; she had a child, John, who died at the age of one month, after a difficult birth. Sarah Sturgeon died of tuberculosis on 5 May 1808. She had wished to be buried in her father's garden at Rathfarnham, beside her sister Gertrude, who had died at the age of twelve after a fall from a window in the house, but her father refused. She was buried in the birthplace of her father at Newmarket, County Cork.

Recognition

Washington Irving, one of America's greatest early writers, devoted "The Broken Heart" in his magnum opus The Sketch Book of Geoffrey Crayon, Gent. to the romance between Robert Emmet and Sarah Curran, citing it as an example of how a broken heart can be fatal.

Irish poet Thomas Moore was inspired by her story to write the popular ballads, "She Is Far from the Land" and "Oh Breathe Not His Name!" and the long poem Lalla Rookh.

She is far from the land where her young hero sleeps,
And lovers around her are sighing,
But coldly she turns from their gaze, and weeps,
For her heart in his grave is lying.

The road leading past Saint Enda's Park in Rathfarnham is called Sarah Curran Avenue. The ruins of The Priory still stand across the road from the park, in The Hermitage housing estate.

There once was a pub in Rathfarnham Village called The Sarah Curran, named in her honour.

In her family's home town of Newmarket, County Cork, there is a statue of Sarah Curran standing across the road from the graveyard where she is buried.

Newmarket also have a local anthem called Up Up Newmarket, written by Fr. Norris. Its air is that of God Save Ireland. Sarah Curran is mentioned within the song lyrics.......

Boston  boasts  of  Bunker  Hill; brave  men  fought  at  Gettysville.
Newmarket too, has  honours  like  the  rest.
Here ’t was  Curran  first  drew  breath; after  Emmet’s  tragic  death
They laid his sweetheart Sarah here to rest.

Amelia Clotilda Jennings wrote a poem about her called "Sarah Curran's Song."

See also 
 Irish Rebellion of 1803

References

People from Rathfarnham
1782 births
1808 deaths
19th-century deaths from tuberculosis
Tuberculosis deaths in Ireland
18th-century Irish people
19th-century Irish people